National Income Life Insurance Company (NILICO), based in Rochester, New York, United States, is an insurance company providing supplemental life insurance to members of labor unions, credit unions, and associations.

History
NILICO’s parent company, the insurance American Income Life (AIL), was founded more than 50 years ago by Bernard Rapoport with $25,000 of borrowed capital.

NILICO products include life insurance, accident & supplementary health insurance and safe kit for children at no cost.

References

Life insurance companies of the United States
Financial services companies based in California
Companies based in San Francisco
Financial services companies established in 2000
2000 establishments in California
Globe Life Subsidiaries